Mount Hermon is an unincorporated community in Alamance County, North Carolina, United States. The community is centered between North Carolina Highway 87, and North Carolina Highway 49, in south-central Alamance County.

References
 

Unincorporated communities in Alamance County, North Carolina
Unincorporated communities in North Carolina